Ashok Agarwal is the Director of the Andrology Center, and also the Director of Research at the American Center for Reproductive Medicine at Cleveland Clinic, Cleveland, USA. He is Professor at the Cleveland Clinic Lerner College of Medicine of Case Western Reserve University, USA. Ashok is a Senior Staff in the Cleveland Clinic's Glickman Urological and Kidney Institute. He has published extensive translational research in human infertility and assisted reproduction.

Education
Ashok obtained his BSc (Honors) in 1975, MSc in 1977 and PhD in 1983 at Banaras Hindu University, Varanasi (India), under the guidance of Late C. J. Dominic, PhD, FNA. He did his post-doctoral research on a Rockefeller Foundation Fellowship at the Division of Urology, Harvard Medical School and the Brigham and Women's Hospital in Boston, Massachusetts (1984–1986), under the guidance of Anita P. Hoffer, PhD, Ed.D.

Professional life
After his post-doctoral training at Harvard Medical School, Boston, Ashok worked as the Director of the Andrology Laboratory and Sperm Bank at the Newton-Wellesley Hospital, Boston (Medical Director: Robert A. Newton, M.D., F.A.C.S.) between 1986 and 1988. He was then appointed as the Director of Male Infertility Research and as an instructor in surgery and later an Assistant Professor of Urology at Harvard Medical School (Director of Urologic Research: Kevin R. Loughlin, M.D.) between 1988 and 1992. Aside from his teaching responsibilities, Ashok worked as the Coordinator of Andrology Testing in the Reproductive Endocrinology Laboratory in the Brigham and Women's Hospital (Medical Director: George L. Mutter, M.D.). Ashok was appointed in 1993 by the Cleveland Clinic Foundation, Ohio, as the Head of the Clinical Andrology Center, which over the years under his leadership, has become a center of excellence for the diagnosis of male infertility and for fertility preservation of men with oncological conditions in the United States.

Ashok is a board certified Clinical Laboratory Director (HCLD) in Andrology by the American Board of Bioanalysis and an Inspector for the College of American Pathologists "Reproductive Laboratory Program" for accreditation of Andrology and In Vitro Fertilization (IVF) Laboratories. He has served as the Chairman of Board of the American College of Embryology from 2009 to 2012.

He is the Director of the highly successful Summer Internship Course in Reproductive Medicine. In the last 13 years, over 320 pre-med and medical students from across the United States and overseas have graduated from this highly successful annual program.

Ashok is active in basic and clinical research and his laboratory has trained more than 525 basic scientists and clinical researchers from over 55 countries. His American Center for Reproductive Medicine has provided hands on training to 210 candidates in human assisted reproduction (Embryology and Andrology techniques) from 45 countries.

By the number of citations, he is the most cited author of several medicaljournals such as Fertility and Sterility, Urology, Reproductive Biomedicine Online, Andrologia, Reproductive Biology and Endocrinology.  Ashok has been invited as a guest speaker to over 30 countries for important international meetings. He has directed more than a dozen Assisted Reproductive Technology (ART) and Andrology Laboratory Workshops and Symposia in recent years. He is a member of the International Advisory Committee on Male Infertility for the Society for Translational Medicine.

Publications, editorship and reviewership
Ashok has published over 840 research articles and reviews in peer reviewed PubMed-indexed scientific journals. He has also authored over 225 book chapters in specialized medical books, and presented over 830 papers at both national and international scientific meetings. His Hirsch index (h-index) is 150 (Google Scholar) and 107 (Scopus), while his citation count is over 90,653 on Google Scholar.  According to ResearchGate, Ashok has an RG Score of 54.37 on 2,193 publications (1245 articles, 54 books, 250 chapters, 486 conference papers). Ashok is ranked as the No. 1 Author in andrology/male Infertility and ART-related research, based on a Global Ranking of Authors Publishing in Andrology or Male Infertility report employing exhaustive searches on the Scopus database. Ashok is currently an editor of 42 medical text books or manuals related to male infertility, ART, fertility preservation, sperm chromatin damage and antioxidants. He is also the Guest Editor of 12 special journal issues and an ad hoc reviewer for over 50 scientific journals.

Ashok serves on the Editorial Board of Asian Journal of Andrology, Human Andrology, Human Fertility, International Brazilian Journal of Urology, International Journal of Fertility & Sterility, Reproductive BioMedicine Online, Reproductive Biology & Endocrinology, Translational Andrology and Urology, The World Journal of Men's Health, and International Journal of Molecular Sciences.

Scientific career
Ashok is the recipient of over 100 research grants and is actively involved in laboratory and clinical studies looking at the efficacy of certain antioxidants in improving the fertility of male patients.

1990–1999
In the early years, Ashok and his team at ACRM studied the physiological levels of reactive oxygen species (ROS) and its relationship with sperm quality in healthy volunteers of unproven fertility and in infertile men. They went on to study the negative effects of oxidative stress generated during sperm processing and cryopreservation during ART procedures on semen quality. Ashok and his researchers looked into the cut-off values for ROS levels to distinguish between fertile and infertile men and the measurement of oxidative stress.

2000-2009
In the following decade, Ashok and his team at ACRM investigated the physiological and pathophysiological effects (both direct and indirect) of endogenous and exogenous ROS. Ashok and his researchers continued to examine normal range of ROS generation to distinguish between fertile and infertile men.

2010–2014
In the new millennium, Ashok and his team at ACRM examined the role of antioxidants (e.g. carnitines, vitamins C and E, pentoxifyline) as defense mechanisms to neutralize and prevent the over-production of ROS in relation to male infertility.

Current research
In the more recent years, Ashok has been working on the studies on molecular markers of oxidative stress, DNA integrity, effect of radio frequency radiation on fertility and fertility preservation in patients with cancer. His research focus currently is on the use of proteomics and bioinformatics tools in discovering the biological processes and pathways underlying OS-induced infertility.

Awards and honors
 2007: SCSA Research Award, American Society for Reproductive Medicine
 2008: CCF Innovation Award 2007 for "Supplementation of L Carnitine in the Culture Media Causes a Significant Decrease in DNA Damage and Improves Embryo Quality – A Novel Finding"
 2011–2012: Innovator Award, Cleveland Clinic Innovations 
 2010–2019: Star Award, American Society for Reproductive Medicine
 2011, 2013, 2014: Scholarship in Teaching Award, Case Western Reserve University Medical School for the Summer Internship Course in Reproductive Medicine,  
 2013, 2014: Scholarship in Teaching Award, Case Western Reserve University School of Medicine for the Training Program in Advanced Reproductive Techniques
 2017: Outstanding Paper Award (along with his two collaborators from Hong Kong and Brazil), Asian Journal of Andrology 
 2018: Exceptional Research Productivity and Outstanding Research Collaboration, Hamad Medical Corporation, Doha, Qatar
 2018: Outstanding Paper Award for Proteomic signatures of infertile men with clinical varicocele and their validation studies reveal mitochondrial dysfunction leading to infertility, Asian Journal of Andrology 
 2018: Outstanding Paper Award for Spermatozoa protein alterations in infertile men with bilateral varicocele, Asian Journal of Andrology
 2019: IVF Expert of the Year, American College of Embryology
 2019: Most Cited Article Award for Role of Antioxidants in Assisted Reproductive Techniques, World Journal of Men's Health
 2020: Excellence in Online Education by Mexican Association of Reproductive Medicine and Arab School of Urology
 2021: Excellence in Online Education by Royal College of Ob-Gyn in Egypt, the American College of Embryology, and French speaking Society of Andrology

Membership in professional societies (since) 
 1984 – American Society for Reproductive Medicine
 1984 – American Society of Andrology		
 1993 – American Urological Association
 1993 – Society for the Study of Male Reproduction
 1994 – Asian Society of Andrology
 1994 – European Society of Human Reproduction & Embryology	
 1994 – American Association of Bioanalysis
 1996 – Society for Male Reproduction and Urology
 2013 – Alpha Scientists in Reproductive Medicine

Publications 
A complete repository of Ashok's research publications (1991 – current) is available here. Ashok Agarwal's ORCID ID is https://orcid.org/0000-0003-0585-1026 and his Scopus Author ID is 7401480880. His Research Gate profile is available here.

Selected scientific publications from Ashok Agarwal

Books

Human Reproduction 
 Proteomics in Human Reproduction: Biomarkers for Millennials. Authors: Ashok Agarwal, Luna Samanta, Damayanthi Durairajanayagam, Paula Intasqui, 2016, 
 Exercise and Human Reproduction: Induced Fertility Disorders and Possible Therapies. Editors: Diana Martin, Stefan Du Plessis, Ashok Agarwal, 2016, 
 Oxidative Stress in Human Reproduction: Shedding Light on a Complicated Phenomenon. Editors: Ashok Agarwal, Rakesh Sharma, Sajal Gupta, Avi Harlev, Gulfam Ahmad, Stefan S. du Plessis, Sandro C. Esteves, Siew May Wang, Damayanthi Durairajanayagam, 2017, 
 Oxidants, Antioxidants, and Impact of the Oxidative Status in Male Reproduction. Editors: Ralf Henkel, Luna Samanta, Ashok Agarwal, 2018,

Male Fertility 
 Studies on Men's Health and Fertility. Editors: Ashok Agarwal, John Aitken, Huan Alvarez, 2012, 
 Male Infertility: A Complete Guide to Lifestyle and Environmental Factors. Editors: Stefan Du Plessis, Edmund S. Sabanegh, Ashok Agarwal, 2014, 
 Varicocele and Male Infertility: Current Concepts, Controversies and Consensus. Authors: Alaa Hamada, Sandro C. Esteves, Ashok Agarwal, 2016, 
 Varicocele and Male Infertility: A Complete Guide. Authors: Sandro C. Esteves, Chak-Lam Cho, Ahmad Majzoub, Ashok Agarwal, 2019, 
 Herbal Medicine in Andrology Authors: Ralf Henkel, Ashok Agarwal, 2021,

Male Infertility – Management 
 Male Infertility: Contemporary Clinical Approaches, Andrology, ART and Antioxidants. Editors: Sijo Parekattil, Ashok Agarwal, 2012, 
 Medical and Surgical Management of Male Infertility. Editors: Botros Rizk, Nabil Aziz, Ashok Agarwal, Edmund Sabanegh, 2013, 
 Understanding Male Infertility Global Practices and Indian Perspective. Editors: Sonia Malik, Ashok Agarwal, 2014, 
 Unexplained Infertility: Pathophysiology, Evaluation and Treatment. Editors: Glen Schattman, Sandro Esteves, Ashok Agarwal, 2015, 
 Male Infertility in Reproductive Medicine: Diagnosis and Management, 1st Edition. Editors: Botros Rizk, Ashok Agarwal, Edmund S. Sabanegh Jr., 2019, 
 Male Infertility: Contemporary Clinical Approaches, Andrology, ART and Antioxidants second edition. Editors: Sijo Parekattil, Sandro Estevas, Ashok Agarwal, 2020,

Sperm Chromatin 
 Sperm Chromatin: Biological and Clinical Applications in Male Infertility and Assisted Reproduction. Editors: Armand Zini, Ashok Agarwal, 2011, 
 Sperm Chromatin for the Researcher: A Practical Guide. Editors: Armand Zini, Ashok Agarwal, 2013,

Female Fertility 
 Studies on Women's Health. Editors: Ashok Agarwal, Botros Rizk, Nabil Aziz, 2012, 
 Endometriosis: A Comprehensive Update. Authors: Sajal Gupta, Avi Harlev, Ashok Agarwal, 2015, 
 Puberty: Physiology and Abnormalities. Editors: Philip Kumanov and Ashok Agarwal, Springer Publishing, New York, 2016. 
 Recurrent Pregnancy Loss: Evidence-Based Evaluation, Diagnosis and Treatment. Editors: Asher Bashiri, Avi Harlev, Ashok Agarwal, 2016,

Fertility Preservation 
 Fertility Preservation: Emerging Technologies and Clinical Applications. Editors: Emre Seli, Ashok Agarwal, 2011, 
 Fertility Preservation in Females: Emerging Technology and Clinical Applications. Editors: Emre Seli, Ashok Agarwal, 2012, 
 Fertility Preservation in Males: Emerging Technology and Clinical Applications. Editors: Emre Seli, Ashok Agarwal, Springer, 2012, 
 The Complete Guide to Male Fertility Preservation. Editors: Ahmad Majzoub, Ashok Agarwal, 2018,

Assisted Reproductive Techniques (ART) 
 Quality Management in ART Clinics. Editors: Fabíola Bento, Sandro Esteves, Ashok Agarwal, 2012, 
 Gamete Assessment, Selection and Micromanipulation in ART. Editors: Zsolt Peter Nagy, Alex Varghese, Ashok Agarwal, 2013, 
 Strategies to Ameliorate Oxidative Stress During Assisted Reproduction. Editors: Ashok Agarwal, Damayanthi Durairajanayagam, Gurpriya Virk, Stefan Du Plessis, 2015,

ART Guides, Manuals, Methods and Protocols 
 Practical Manual of In Vitro Fertilization: Advanced Methods and Novel Devices. Editors: Zsolt Peter Nagy, Alex Varghese, Ashok Agarwal, 2012, 
 Clinical Embryology: A Practical Guide. Editors: Zsolt Peter Nagy, Alex Varghese, Ashok Agarwal, 2013, 
 Building and Managing an IVF Laboratory: A Practical Guide. Editors: Zsolt Peter Nagy, Alex Varghese, Ashok Agarwal, 2013, 
 Non-Invasive Sperm Selection for the In Vitro Fertilization: Novel Concepts and Methods. Editors: Ashok Agarwal, Edson Borges Jr., Amanda S. Setti, 2015, 
 Cryopreservation of Mammalian Gametes and Embryos: Methods and Protocols. Editors: Zsolt Peter Nagy, Alex C. Varghese, Ashok Agarwal, 2017, 
 In Vitro Fertilization: A Textbook of Current and Emerging Methods and Devices, Second Edition. Editors: Zsolt Peter Nagy, Alex Varghese, Ashok Agarwal, 2019,

Andrology Laboratory Guides, Manuals and Workbooks 
 Andrology Laboratory Manual. Editors: Kaimini Rao, Ashok Agarwal, MS Srinivas, 2010, 
 Workbook on Human Spermatozoa and Assisted Conceptions. Editors: Sonia Malik, Ashok Agarwal, 2012, 
 Andrological Evaluation of Male Infertility: A Laboratory Guide. Editors: Agarwal A, Gupta S, Sharma R, 2016, 
 Manual Sperm Retrieval and Preparation in Human Assisted Reproduction. Editors: Ashok Agarwal, Ahmad Majzoub, Sandro Esteves, 2021, 
 Manual of Sperm Function Testing in Human Assisted Reproduction. Editors: Ashok Agarwal, Ralf Henkel, Ahmad Majzoub, 2021,

Guides for Clinicians 
 Male Infertility for the Clinician: A Practical Guide. Editors: Sijo Parekattil, Ashok Agarwal, 2013, 
 Sperm Chromatin for the Clinician: A Practical Guide. Editors: Armand Zini, Ashok Agarwal, 2013, 
 Antioxidants in Male Infertility: A Guide for Clinicians and Researchers. Editors: Sijo Parekattil, Ashok Agarwal, 2013, 
 The Diagnosis and Treatment of Male Infertility: A Case-Based Guide for Clinicians. Editors: Nabil Aziz, Ashok Agarwal, 2017, 
 A Clinician's Guide to Sperm DNA and Chromatin Damage. Editors: Armand Zini, Ashok Agarwal, 2018, 
 Genetics of Male Infertility: A Case-Based Guide for Clinicians. Editors: Mohamed Arafa, Haitham Elbardisi, Ahmad Majzoub, Ashok Agarwal, 2020,

Journal Special Issues (Guest Editor) 
 Hot Topics in Male Infertility: Panminerva Medica, Volume 61, Issue 2, June 2019
 Hot Topics in Female Infertility: Panminerva Medica, Volume 61, Issue 1, March 2019
 Updates in Male Factor Infertility: Arab Journal of Urology, Volume 16, Issue 1, March 2018.
 Sperm DNA Fragmentation: Translational Andrology and Urology, Volume 6, Suppl 4, September 2017.
 Varicocele and Male Infertility: Asian Journal of Andrology, Volume 18, Number 2, March 2016.
 The Azoospermic Male: Current Knowledge and Future Perspectives: CLINICS, Volume 68, Number 1, February 2013.
 Advances in Andrology and Male Reproductive Health: The Open Reproductive Science Journal, Volume 3, 2011.
 Current Concepts in Assisted Reproduction and Fertility Preservation (Part II): Current Women’s Health Reviews, Volume 6, Number 3, August 2010.
 Current Concepts in Female Infertility Management (Part I): Current Women’s Health Reviews, Volume 6, Number 2, May 2010.
 Infertility: Archives of Medical Science, Volume 5 (1A), 2009.
 An Update on Clinical Utility and Diagnostic Value of Various Andrological Techniques, Volume 53 (2), 2020. 
 An Update on Male Infertility: Factors, Mechanisms and Interventions, Volume 53 (1), 2020. 
 Men’s Health, Volume 19 (3), 2021.

References

External links 
 Dr. Agarwal's Biosketch (February 2022) 
 Andrology Center and Reproductive Tissue Bank (August 2019)

American people of Indian descent
Indian medical researchers
American andrologists
Healthcare in Cleveland
Indian medical educators
Case Western Reserve University faculty
Harvard Medical School people
Rockefeller Fellows
Banaras Hindu University alumni
Living people
Year of birth missing (living people)
Scientists from Lucknow